Dupontia is a genus of small air-breathing land snails, terrestrial pulmonate gastropod mollusks in the family Euconulidae, the hive snails.

Species 
Species within the genus Dupontia include:
 Dupontia levis
 Dupontia nitella
 Dupontia perlucida
 Dupontia poweri
 Dupontia proletaria

References

 Type description of Dupontia Godwin-Austen 1908 is in Ann. Mag. nat. Hist., (8) 2, 428

 
Taxonomy articles created by Polbot